The Prix Marcel Pollitzer, formally the Prix des écrivains combattants Fondation Marcel Pollitzer, is a French literary award created in 1953 by the Association des écrivains combattants.  Named for writer Marcel Pollitzer, it is awarded every year to "a work of history and, preferably, to a biography".

List of winners
Source: Association des écrivains combattants

1972 - Claude Michelet
1973 - Gabriel de Broglie
1974 - Micheline Dupuy
1975 - Françoise de Bernardy
1976 - Philippe Ragueneau
1977 - Roger Glachant
1978 - Pierre Levergeois
1979 - Bernardine Melchior-Bonnet
1980 - Paul Guth
1981 - Arnaud d'Antin de Vaillac
1982 - Danièle Decure
1983 - Marc Audry
1984 - Pierre Miquel
1985 - Hervé Le Boterf
1986 - Christian Pennera
1987 - Micheline Dupray
1988 - Bernard Pierre
1989 - Gaston Palewski
1990 - Michel Herubel
1991 - Philippe Séguin, Napoléon le Grand (Éditions Grasset)
1992 - Arthur Conte
1993 - Pierre Pellissier
1994 - Jacques Hubert
1995 - François Bayrou
1996 - Hélie de Saint Marc
1997 - Claude Guy, En écoutant de Gaulle (Grasset)
1998 - Guillemette de Sairigne, Mon illustre inconnu (Fayard)
1999 - Geneviève de Gaulle-Anthonioz, La Traversée de la nuit (Éditions du Seuil)
2000 - André Sellier
2001 - Geneviève Salkin
2002 - François Broche
2003 - Jean-Christophe Notin
2004 - Philippe Doumenc, Les amants de Tonnegrange (Seuil) 
2005 - Georges Longeret, Jacques Laurent and Cyril Bondroit, Les combats de la RC4 (Indo Éd.) 
2006 - Amaury Lorin, Paul Doumer (L'Harmattan)
2007 - André Turcat
2008 - Francis Huré, Portrait de Pechkoff (Éditions de Fallois)
2009 - Dominique Paladhile, Le Grand Condé (Pygmalion)
2010 - Charles Zorgbibe, Metternich, le séducteur diplomate (de Fallois)
2011 - Henri Bogdan, Les Hohenzollern (Perrin)
2012 - Jean Casterède, Louis XIII et Richelieu (France-Empire)
2013 - Pierre Milza, Garibaldi (Robert Laffont)
2014 - Catherine Decours, Juliette Récamier (Perrin)
2015 - Jean-Christian Petitfils, Louis XV (Perrin)

See also

 List of history awards

References

French literary awards
History awards
Biography awards
Awards established in 1953